Desert lizard may refer to:
Any number of lizards that may be found in desert climates
Desert horned lizard
Desert night lizard